David William Sutton (born 15 December 1966) is an English former professional footballer who played in the Football League for Crewe Alexandra.

Career
Sutton was born in Leek, Staffordshire and began his career with Stoke City. He failed to break into the first team at Stoke and joined Fourth Division side Crewe Alexandra in 1986 where he made two appearances, one in the league where he scored in a 1–1 draw at Rochdale and the other in a 4–0 League Cup defeat against Shrewsbury Town. He went on to play for non-league sides Ashton United, Leek Town and Newcastle Town.

Career statistics
Source:

References

1966 births
Living people
English footballers
Association football forwards
English Football League players
Stoke City F.C. players
Crewe Alexandra F.C. players
Leek Town F.C. players
Ashton United F.C. players
Newcastle Town F.C. players